CBOCS may refer to:
Community Based Outpatient Clinics (CBOCs), a type of medical facility for veterans in the United States
Cracker Barrel Old Country Store, Inc., an American restaurant chain